Pritam Chakraborty, better known by the mononym Pritam, is an Indian music director, composer, singer and record producer for Bollywood films. In a career spanning nearly two decades, he has composed music for more than 125 Bollywood movies. He has won five Filmfare Awards, four Zee Cine Awards, three Star Screen Awards and three IIFA Awards among many others.

Composer
He has been frequent collaborators with directors like Imtiaz Ali, Anurag Basu, Kabir Khan, Priyadarshan and more. His frequent lyricists are Sameer, Mayur Puri, Irshad Kamil, Sayeed Quadri, Amitabh Bhattacharya.

In his long career, almost every popular singer has sung for his films. His frequent playback Singers are Sonu Nigam, KK, Shaan, Atif Aslam, Mohit Chauhan, Shreya Ghoshal, Sunidhi Chauhan, Neeraj Shridhar from early phase of his career and Arijit Singh & Antara Mitra, Shilpa Rao, Jubin Nautiyal from recent times. KK has sung over 70+ songs in almost 50 albums for Pritam.

Film soundtracks

Film scores

Compilations

Singles

References

Discographies of Indian artists